Adhotar was a coarse variety handloom cloth with a loosely woven structure. Adhotar was a cloth of locals in the early 19th century. It was one among various other Indian handloom fabrics such as khaddar, and Khasa. 

See also 

 Dosuti
 Khadi
 Bafta cloth
 Longcloth
 Calico
 Chintz

References 

Woven fabrics